All 60 seats in the Wyoming House of Representatives were up for election on November 6, 2018, as part of the 2018 Wyoming elections. Primary elections were held on August 21.

Results summary

Detailed results by State House district 
Source:

District 1

District 2

District 3

District 4

District 5

District 6

District 7

District 8

District 9

District 10

District 11

District 12

District 13

District 14

District 15

District 16

District 17

District 18

District 19

District 20

District 21

District 22

District 23

District 24

District 25

District 26

District 27

District 28

District 29

District 30

District 31

District 32

District 33

District 34

District 35

District 36

District 37

District 38

District 39

District 40

District 41

District 42

District 43

District 44

District 45

District 46

District 47

District 48

District 49

District 50

District 51

District 52

District 53

District 54

District 55

District 56

District 57

District 58

District 59

District 60

References 

House
November 2018 events in the United States
Wyoming House of Representatives
Wyoming House of Representatives elections